Sidewalls is a 2011 comedy-drama film written and directed by Gustavo Taretto.

Plot
In the urban sprawl of Buenos Aires, Martín and Mariana are strangers, living in neighboring apartment buildings. Martín is a web designer, and takes up photography as a way to cope with his fear of the city. Mariana, an aspiring architect, is forced to move back into her old apartment after a breakup. Living solitary lives in one-room "shoebox" apartments, they both contemplate the changing cityscape, and struggle with anxiety and loneliness, feeling disconnected from other people in the digital age.

"A Short Autumn"

Witnessing a series of accidents on the street – a prostitute's dog jumps from a balcony, causing a passer-by to be struck by a taxi and another to have a heart attack – Martín and Mariana separately stop to help. Martín is diagnosed with a harmless case of discarthrosis, and has adopted his ex-girlfriend's dog after she abandoned them both to move to the United States. Mariana, working as a window dresser, finds herself talking to the store mannequins she assembles at home. She rediscovers one of her favorite Where's Wally? books, with a page she has never been able to solve. Ignoring a call from her ex-boyfriend, she thinks back on the end of their four-year relationship.

"A Long Winter"

Martín and Mariana pass frequently in the street without meeting. Spending most of his time online, Martín orders a new desk chair and hires a dogwalker, Ana. They begin dating, but she is already in a relationship and disappears from his life. Mariana agrees to a date with a client, Lucas, at a restaurant at the top of a skyscraper. Explaining her phobia of elevators, she takes the stairs, to Lucas' dismay; as he waits at their table, she is overcome with anxiety and leaves. Finding Martín's old chair at the curb, she brings it home, and deletes all her pictures of her ex-boyfriend. She tells the story of the famed Kavanagh Building, and is drawn to the music from a neighbor's new piano. Martín tries online dating and meets Marcela, a manic polyglot, but their date ends in disappointment. He begins swimming at Mariana's local pool, where she meets fellow avid swimmer Rafa. They go on a date, and Mariana reacts kindly when Rafa experiences erectile dysfunction, but he deserts her.

"Spring at Last"

Mariana reflects on the unremarkable exterior "sidewalls" of the city's buildings. Seeking change in her life, she gets a lip piercing, and she and Martín each have a new window installed in their apartments. They unknowingly look out at each other while listening to "True Love Will Find You in the End" on the radio, and are both moved to tears by the ending of Manhattan on TV. By chance, they connect with each other online in an anonymous chat room, but just as Mariana asks for Martín's phone number, the city is plunged in a blackout. Buying candles at the same store in the dark, they unwittingly share a static shock before going their separate ways. Later, from her window, Mariana spots Martín walking his dog, wearing a red-and-white-striped sweater similar to that of Where's Wally? She conquers her fear of the elevator and races outside where they finally meet. During the closing credits, Martín and Mariana – now living happily together – record a home video, lip-syncing to "Ain't No Mountain High Enough".

Cast
  as Martín
 Pilar López de Ayala as Mariana
 Inés Efron as Ana
  as Rafa
 Jorge Lanata as doctor
 Carla Peterson as Marcela
 Adrián Navarro as Lucas
 Alan Pauls as Mariana's ex-boyfriend

References

External links
 

2011 films
2011 comedy-drama films
2010s Argentine films
2010s German films
2010s Spanish films
2010s Spanish-language films
Argentine comedy-drama films
Films set in Buenos Aires
Films shot in Buenos Aires
German comedy-drama films
Spanish comedy-drama films